1997 ACC tournament may refer to:

 1997 ACC men's basketball tournament
 1997 ACC women's basketball tournament
 1997 ACC men's soccer tournament
 1997 ACC women's soccer tournament
 1997 Atlantic Coast Conference baseball tournament
 1997 Atlantic Coast Conference softball tournament